KID (an acronym standing for Kindle Imagine Develop) was a Japan-based company specializing in porting and developing bishōjo games.

History 
KID was founded in 1988, with capital of 160 million yen. In the early 1990s, it served primarily as a contract developer. Notable titles from this era include Burai Fighter, Low G Man, G.I. Joe, Isolated Warrior and Recca. In 1997, it began porting PC games to games consoles. In 1999, it released an original title called Memories Off on PlayStation, which later became its first well-known series. In 2000, it released the original title Never 7: The End of Infinity, the first in the Infinity series. KID also created the popular underground PlayStation game Board Game Top Shop. In 2005, KID became a sponsor of the Japanese drama series Densha Otoko.

The company declared bankruptcy in 2006. However, in February 2007 it was announced that KID's intellectual properties had been acquired by the CyberFront Corporation, which would continue all unfinished projects until its closure in December 2013.

Kaga Create then bought CyberFront Corporation and owned the rights to KID's works. After Kaga Create closed down, 5pb. bought Cyberfront's assets which also included all of KID's works.

Works

Infinity series

Infinity Cure
Never 7: The End of Infinity
Ever 17: The Out of Infinity
Remember 11: The Age of Infinity
12Riven: The Psi-Climinal of Integral

Memories Off series

Memories Off
Memories Off 2nd
You that became a Memory ~Memories Off~
Memories Off ~And then~
Memories Off ~And Then Again~
Memories Off 5: Togireta Film
Memories Off #5 encore
Your Memories Off: Girl's Style

Other
Blocken (Arcade)
Armored Police Metal Jack (Game Boy)
Kingyo Chūihō! 2 Gyopichan o Sagase! (Game Boy)
Battle Grand Prix (SNES)
Jumpin' Derby (Super Famicom)
Super Bowling (SNES)
Super Jinsei Game (series) (2 & 3) (Super Famicom)
Chibi Maruko-chan: Okozukai Daisakusen (Game Boy, 1990)
Chibi Maruko-Chan 2: Deluxe Maruko World (Game Boy, 1991)
Chibi Maruko-chan 3: Mezase! Game Taishou no Maki (Game Boy, 1992)
Chibi Maruko-chan 4: Korega Nihon Dayo Ouji Sama (Game Boy, 1992)
Chibi Maruko-Chan: Maruko Deluxe Gekijou (Game Boy, 1995)
Burai Fighter
Low G Man: The Low Gravity Man
Bananan Ouji no Daibouken
Kick Master
G.I. Joe
G.I. Joe: The Atlantis Factor
Rock 'n' Ball
Sumo Fighter: Tōkaidō Basho
UFO Kamen Yakisoban
Sutobasu Yarō Shō: 3 on 3 Basketball
Mini 4WD Shining Scorpion Let's & Go!!
Pepsiman
Doki! Doki! Yūenchi: Crazy Land Daisakusen (Famicom)
Ai Yori Aoshi (PS2 and PC adaptation)
Ryu-Koku (final game released before the bankruptcy)
Separate Hearts
Ski Air Mix
Recca (Famicom Shooter created for the "Summer Carnival '92" gaming tournament)
We Are*
Close to: Inori no Oka
Yume no Tsubasa
Max Warrior: Wakusei Kaigenrei
Kaitou Apricot (PlayStation)
Kiss yori... (Sega Saturn and WonderSwan)
6 Inch my Darling (Sega Saturn)
Dokomademo Aoku... (consumer port of TopCat's Hateshinaku Aoi, Kono Sora no Shita de...)
Kagayaku Kisetsu e (consumer port of Tactics' One: Kagayaku Kisetsu e)
She'sn
Screen (consumer port of Ather's Campus ~Sakura no Mau Naka de~)
Emmyrea (consumer port of Penguin Soft's Nemureru Mori no Ohime-sama)
My Merry May
Iris
Flamberge no Seirei (consumer port of Nikukyuu's Mei King)
Prism Heart (Dreamcast)
Oujisama Lv1 (PlayStation)
Boku to Bokura no Natsu (Dreamcast)
Monochrome (PlayStation 2 and PSP)
Hōkago Ren'ai Club – Koi no Etude (Sega Saturn)
Subete ga F ni Naru (PlayStation)

References

External links
KID Official site
Bankruptcy info and notes in English via insert credit

 List of KID games at GameFAQs

Amusement companies of Japan
Defunct video game companies of Japan
Video game companies established in 1988
Video game companies disestablished in 2006
Video game development companies
Japanese companies established in 1988
Japanese companies disestablished in 2006
Companies that have filed for bankruptcy in Japan